Herbert Errol Cook (24 December 1923 – 19 December 1986) was a New Zealand rugby union and professional rugby league footballer who played in the 1940s and 1950s, and coached rugby league in the 1950s. He played representative level rugby union (RU) for 2nd New Zealand Expeditionary Force "Kiwis", and representative level rugby league (RL) for Other Nationalities, and at club level for Leeds, Keighley and Dewsbury, as a goal-kicking , i.e. number 1, and coached club level rugby league (RL) for Keighley and Dewsbury.

References

External links
 ĎŔƑ The Rock n Roll 50s – Keighley to Cougars
(archived by web.archive.org) The 50s Part 2 – Keighley to Cougars

1923 births
1986 deaths
People from Wairoa
Dewsbury Rams coaches
Dewsbury Rams players
Keighley Cougars coaches
Keighley Cougars players
Leeds Rhinos players
New Zealand rugby league coaches
New Zealand rugby league players
New Zealand rugby union players
Other Nationalities rugby league team players
Rugby league fullbacks
New Zealand military personnel of World War II
Rugby union players from the Hawke's Bay Region
Rugby league players from Hawke's Bay Region
New Zealand expatriate sportspeople in England